David L. Itzkoff (born March 2, 1976) is an American journalist and writer who is a culture reporter for The New York Times. He is the author of Cocaine's Son, a memoir about growing up with his drug-abusing father. Before joining the Times, he was an associate editor at Spin magazine and at Maxim.

Early life and family
Itzkoff was born in New York City to Madelin and Gerald Itzkoff, and grew up in the Bronx. His father had a cocaine addiction, which affected Dave's home life considerably. He has a sister, Amanda, a psychiatrist. He is Jewish; his paternal grandfather and great-grandfather were Russian Jews who worked in the fur trade.

Itzkoff obtained his B.A. in English Literature from Princeton University in 1998. He married actress and singer Amy Justman in 2008, and lives in New York.

Career
In 1999, Itzkoff worked as an editorial assistant for Details magazine. He worked for Maxim magazine from 1999 to 2002 and Spin magazine from 2002 to 2006. From June 2007 to July 2008, Itzkoff worked as a freelance editor for the Sunday Styles section in The New York Times. He is a culture reporter for The New York Times and writes frequently about film, television and comedy. His latest work is a biography of Robin Williams.

In 2023, Itzkoff was one of almost 1000 NYT contributors to sign an open letter expressing “serious concerns about editorial bias” in the newspaper's reporting on transgender people. The letter characterized the NYT’s reporting as using “an eerily familiar mix of pseudoscience and euphemistic, charged language”, and raised concerns regarding the NYT’s employment practices regarding trans contributors.

Books
Lads: A Memoir of Manhood, published in 2004
Cocaine's Son: A Memoir, published in 2011
Mad as Hell: The Making of Network and the Fateful Vision of the Angriest Man in Movies, published February 2014.  
Robin, a biography of Robin Williams, published in May 2018

References

1976 births
20th-century American journalists
20th-century American male writers
21st-century American journalists
21st-century American male writers
21st-century American biographers
21st-century memoirists
American memoirists
American newspaper reporters and correspondents
American people of Russian-Jewish descent
Jewish American journalists
Journalists from New York City
Living people
Princeton University alumni
The New York Times writers
Writers from the Bronx
21st-century American Jews